Polypores are a group of fungi that form large fruiting bodies with pores or tubes on the underside (see Delimitation for exceptions). They are a morphological group of basidiomycetes-like gilled mushrooms and hydnoid fungi, and not all polypores are closely related to each other. Polypores are also called bracket fungi or shelf fungi, and they characteristically produce woody, shelf- or bracket-shaped or occasionally circular fruiting bodies that are called conks.

Most polypores inhabit tree trunks or branches consuming the wood, but some soil-inhabiting species form mycorrhiza with trees. Polypores and the related corticioid fungi are the most important agents of wood decay, playing a very significant role in nutrient cycling and aiding carbon dioxide absorption by forest ecosystems.

Over one thousand polypore species have been described to science, but a large part of the diversity is still unknown even in relatively well-studied temperate areas. Polypores are much more diverse in old natural forests with abundant dead wood than in younger managed forests or plantations. Consequently, a number of species have declined drastically and are under threat of extinction due to logging and deforestation.

Polypores are used in traditional medicine, and they are actively studied for their medicinal value and various industrial applications. Several polypore species are serious pathogens of plantation trees and are major causes of timber spoilage.

Conks, the fruiting bodies of polypores, lie in a close planar grouping of separate or interconnected horizontal rows. Brackets can range from only a single row of a few caps, to dozens of rows of caps that can weigh several hundred pounds. They are mainly found on trees (living and dead) and coarse woody debris, and may resemble mushrooms. Some form annual fruiting bodies while others are perennial and grow larger year after year. Bracket fungi are typically tough and sturdy and produce their spores, called basidiospores, within the pores that typically make up the undersurface.

Classification
Because bracket fungi are defined by their growth form rather than phylogeny, the group contains members of multiple clades.  Although the term 'bracket fungi' classically was reserved for polypores, molecular studies have revealed some odd relationships. The beefsteak fungus, a well-known bracket fungus, is actually a member of the agarics. Other examples of bracket fungi include the sulphur shelf, birch bracket, dryad's saddle, artist's conk, and turkey tail.  The name polypores is often used for a group that includes many of the hard or leathery fungi, which often lack a stipe, growing straight out of wood. "Polypore" is derived from the Greek words poly, meaning "much" or "many", and poros, meaning "pore".

The group includes many different shapes and forms that are common in the tropical forests, including the hard 'cup fungi' and the 'shell', 'plate' and 'bracket' fungus commonly found growing off logs and still standing dead trees.

Description

The fungal individual that develops the fruit bodies that are identified as polypores resides in soil or wood as mycelium. Polypores are often restricted to either deciduous (angiosperm) or conifer (gymnosperm) host trees. Some species depend on a single tree genus (e.g. Piptoporus betulinus on birch, Perenniporia corticola on dipterocarps).

Forms of polypore fruit bodies range from mushroom-shaped to thin effused patches (crusts) that develop on dead wood. Perennial fruit bodies of some species growing on living trees can grow over 80 years old (e.g. Phellinus igniarius). Most species of polypores develop new, short-lived fruit bodies annually or several times every year. Abundant fruit takes place during the autumn or rainy season.

Structure of the fruit bodies is simple. Effused or resupinate fruit bodies typically consist of two layers - a tube layer of vertically arranged tubes that open downwards, and supporting layer called subiculum that supports and attached the tubes to substrate. In fruit bodies with a cap (pileate fruit bodies) the tissue between upper surface and the pore layer is called context. A few polypores (e.g. Fomes fomentarius and Inocutis rhaedes) also have a core between context and substrate. A minority of polypores also have a stalk (stipe) that attach to the cap either laterally or centrally depending on the species.

Polypore tubes are a honeycomb-like structure, where the individual tubes have fused together. Their sides are covered with a spore-forming surface, the hymenium. The tubes offer shelter for developing spores and help to increase the area of the spore-producing surface. Pore size and shape vary a lot between species, but little within a species – some Hexagonia spp. have 5 mm wide pores whereas pores of Antrodiella spp. are invisible to naked eye with 15 pores per mm. Generally the larger the pores, the larger the spores. A few polypores produce asexual spores (chlamydospores or conidia) in the upper surface of their cap (e.g. Echinopora aculeifera, Oligoporus ptychogaster) or without the presence of a sexual fruit body (e.g. Inonotus rickii, Heterobasidion spp.).

Ecology
Bracket fungi often grow in semi-circular shapes, looking like trees or wood.  They can be parasitic, saprotrophic, or both.  One of the more common genera, Ganoderma, can grow large thick shelves that may contribute to the death of the tree, and then feed off the wood for years after.  Their hardiness means they are very resilient and can live for quite a long time, with many species even developing beautiful multi-coloured circles of colour that are actually annual growth rings.
Polypores are among the most efficient decomposers of lignin and cellulose, the main components of wood. Due to this ability they dominate communities of wood-rotting organisms in land ecosystems along with corticioid fungi. Through decomposing tree trunks they recycle a major part of nutrients in forests.

Only basidiomycetes are known to initiate lignin degradation (i.e. cause white rot). A recent study linked the end of formation of large-scale coal deposits in the end of the Carboniferous period 300 million years ago to the evolution of lignin-degrading basidiomycetes. More efficient degradation of wood by fungi meant less plant material (and hence less coal) accumulating in the soil.

On the other hand, most brown-rot fungi are polypores. These species have lost their lignin degradation ability but are very efficient in degrading cellulose. Brown-rot fungi are prevalent on conifer hosts and open, sun-exposed habitats. The fungal community in any single trunk may include both white-rot and brown-rot species, complementing each other's wood degradation strategies.

Polypores and other decomposer fungi are the first step in food chains that feed on decomposed plant material. A rich fauna of insects, mites and other invertebrates feed on polypore mycelium and fruiting bodies, further providing food for birds and other larger animals. Woodpeckers and other hole nesting birds typically carve their nests in softer wood decomposed by polypores.

Threats
Almost all polypores are dependent on trees for their survival. Deforestation and intensive forest management cause declines in polypore abundance and diversity. For many species the changes can be too much, and they start a slow slide towards extinction. Since most polypore species are relatively widespread, this process is typically slow. Regional extinctions can happen relatively quickly and have been documented (for instance Antrodia crassa in North Europe).

Polypores can decline for many reasons. They can be dependent on a single host or a very special habitat. For instance Echinodontium ballouii has been found only in Atlantic white cedar swamps in the Northeastern USA. Species can be dependent on very old tree individuals like Bridgeoporus nobilissimus of the Northwestern USA. Both of these species also have a rather restricted range, making them more vulnerable to extinction.

In addition to the host tree individual, the characteristics of the surrounding habitat also matter. Some species prefer closed-canopy forest with a moist, even microclimate that could be disturbed for instance by logging (e.g. Skeletocutis jelicii). Others suffer from lack of open forest-fire habitat in areas where fire suppression is done (e.g. Gloeophyllum carbonarium in Nordic countries where forest fires are part of the natural forest dynamics).

For most declining species the main problem is lack of dead wood in the forest. When suitable tree trunks are too sparse in the landscape, not all species are able to spread to new trunks after old ones have been consumed, causing the population to decline and eventually vanish. Thus, species that are abundant in old-growth forests with abundant dead wood can be totally absent from managed forests. For instance Amylocystis lapponica and Fomitopsis rosea are dominant species in North European old-growth spruce forests from Poland to Norway, but absent in managed forests.

Climate change may cause a problem for polypores that are already dependent on a few fragments of old-growth forests and may be unable to migrate with changing vegetation.

Indicator value
Polypores have been used as indicator species of healthy natural forests or old-growth forests in Europe. They are good indicators of invertebrate diversity on dead wood and include many endangered species. Polypores make good indicators because they are relatively easy to find – many species produce conspicuous and long-lasting fruiting bodies – and because they can be identified in the field.

The first indicator list of polypores widely used in forest inventories and conservation work was developed in northern Sweden in 1992 ("Steget före" method). "Steget före" list included six polypores in three value classes. In Finland, a list of 30 species for spruce-dominated forests was published in 1993 and widely adopted. Later a similar list for pine-dominated forests was published. Longer lists of indicator species have since been published in Sweden.

Many indicator species are red-listed, but not necessarily all. National red lists of fungi typically include many polypores and are used as indicator lists of conservation value in many European countries.

Classification
For most of 20th century polypores were treated as a family, the Polyporaceae. Reconstructions of family tree of fungi show that the poroid fruiting body has evolved numerous times in the past. Modern DNA-based evolutionary classification places polypores to at least 12 orders. The orders containing most polypore species are the Polyporales (genera such as Fomes, Polyporus and Trametes) and Hymenochaetales (e.g. Oxyporus, Phellinus and Trichaptum). Economically perhaps the most significant polypores Heterobasidion spp., pests of conifer plantations, belong to the Russulales. Other polypore orders are the Agaricales, Amylocorticiales, Auriculariales, Boletales, Cantharellales, Gloeophyllales, Sebacinales, Thelephorales and Trechisporales.

The Polyporales in the modern sense are not only polypores but also other fruiting body types such as crust fungi, hydnoid fungi and agaricoid mushrooms. The term polypore describing a morphological group should not be confused with the taxonomic groups Polyporales or Polyporaceae of the modern literature.

Currently polypores are divided into about 170 genera. That number is bound to rise significantly through better understanding of evolutionary relationships between species and through mapping of uncovered diversity in the tropics. All in all classification of polypores is in flux.

Delimitation (morphology)
Most polypores have a poroid hymenium, but not all species. A few, for instance Elmerina holophaea and Lenzites betulina, form gills like agarics but are still considered polypores, since in all other respects they are similar to closely related polypores, forming tough fruiting bodies on the wood. A couple of species where the tubes have not fused together in a honey-comb manner are variably classified as polypores or not (e.g. Porotheleum fimbriatum). There's no clear distinction between polypores and hydnoid fungi - some polypores with irregularly poroid lower surface have been considered both polypores and hydnoid fungi (e.g. Echinodontium tinctorium, Irpex lacteus).

Bolete mushrooms are a separate morphological group not included in polypores even though they have tubes. Fleshy fruiting bodies with a stalk and microscopic characters separate boletes from polypores.

Uses
Some species of bracket fungi are edible, such as sulphur polypore; the lingzhi mushroom is another, which is used in Chinese medicine.  They can also be used as a wick in an oil/fat lamp.

The tinder fungus (Fomes fomentarius) has been used as tinder since at least the time of Ötzi the Iceman. It has also been used to make a material similar to leather.

Ganoderma applanatum, the artist's conk, is used as a substrate for drawings. Fresh specimens develop dark brown lines when drawn upon with a stylus. The lines become permanent when the specimen is dried.

Medicinal uses

Most polypores are edible or at least non-toxic, however one genus of polypores has members that are poisonous.  Polypores from the genus Hapalopilus have caused poisoning in several people with effects including kidney dysfunction and deregulation of central nervous system functions. Some polypores have been used in ritual and for utilitarian purposes for ages; the famous Ötzi the Iceman was found carrying two different polypore species: Piptoporus betulinus, notable for its long usage in European folk medicines, and Fomes fomentarius, which was likely used for starting fires.

Medicinal mushroom polypores in use today are Ganoderma lucidum coll. (reishi or lingzhi), Trametes versicolor (turkey tail) and Ganoderma applanatum (Japanese Kofuki-saru-no-koshikake).  Beyond their traditional use in herbal medicine, contemporary research has suggested many applications of polypores for the treatment of illnesses related to the immune system and cancer recovery.

Several species have been studied for their ability to produce compounds with anti-pathogenic activity.

See also
 Amadou, a flammable substance prepared from bracket fungi
 Pleurotoid fungi have a similar form, but are gilled
 Wood-decay fungus
 List of world's largest mushrooms and conks

References

External links 
 
 

Basidiomycota
Fungus common names
Mushroom types
Articles containing video clips

ka:აბედა სოკოები